The Battle of Baideng (白登之戰) was a military conflict between Han China and the Xiongnu in 200 BC. Han Dynasty of China invaded the territory of the Xiongnu in 200 BC attempting to subjugate them. However the Xiongnu united their forces under Modu Chanyu and surrounded the Han emperor Gaozu in Baideng. The siege was only relieved after seven days when the Han royal court, under Chen Ping's suggestion, sent spies to bribe Modu's wife. 

In an alternate account, Grousset says that the Xiongnu invaded Chinese Shanxi and besieged Taiyuan. Gaozu broke the siege and chased the Xiongnu north, but was blockaded by them on the Baideng plateau near Datong in far northern Shanxi.

Aftermath
After the defeat at Baideng, the Han emperor abandoned a military solution to the Xiongnu threat. Instead, in 198 BC, the courtier Liu Jing (劉敬) was dispatched for negotiations. The peace settlement eventually reached between the parties included a so called Han "princess" given in marriage to the chanyu (called heqin 和親); periodic tribute of silk, liquor and rice to the Xiongnu; equal status between the states; and the Great Wall as mutual border. This treaty set the pattern for relations between the Han and the Xiongnu for some sixty years, until the Emperor Wu of Han decided to revive the policy to wage war against Xiongnu. The Han dynasty sent random unrelated commoner women falsely labeled as "princesses" and members of the Han imperial family multiple times when they were practicing Heqin marriage alliances with the Xiongnu in order to avoid sending the emperor's daughters.

See also

Han-Xiongnu wars

References

Further reading
 Yap, Joseph P. pp 71–76. "Wars With The Xiongnu, A Translation From Zizhi tongjian" AuthorHouse (2009) 

200s BC conflicts
200 BC
Baideng 200 BC
Baideng
2nd century BC in China
Military history of Shanxi
Emperor Gaozu of Han